James Samuel Thorne is an English professional footballer who most recently played for Hartlepool United as a forward.

Club career

Early career
Having progressed through the academy at his hometown club Manchester City, Thorne was released in 2014 without having made a first-team appearance. Following this, he had a short spell with Salford City before signing on non-contract terms with Macclesfield Town in 2015, for whom he made one appearance on the bench. Later that year, Thorne joined the academy at Nottingham Forest.

Nottingham Forest
Thorne began the 2015–16 season for Forest's under-21 side in fine form, scoring four goals in three games in the Professional Development League. As his form continued, clubs in Football Leagues One and Two were reported to be interested in taking Thorne on loan, but no move ever materialised.
The following season, Thorne made his professional debut for the club on 23 August 2016, starting in a 2–1 win over Millwall in the EFL Cup. On 24 February 2017 Thorne returned to Macclesfield Town on a one-month loan deal, having failed to make another first-team appearance for Forest.

Hartlepool United
Thorne signed for Hartlepool United on 28 September 2017, following a successful trial period with the North-East club.

Career statistics

References

External links
 

Living people
Footballers from Manchester
English footballers
Association football forwards
Salford City F.C. players
Macclesfield Town F.C. players
Nottingham Forest F.C. players
Hartlepool United F.C. players
English Football League players
1996 births